Krishi Public School, is a private educational institute, primary and secondary in a town called Sathupally, Khammam District, Telangana state, India.

History
The school was started in the year 1990 and now it has been expanded to different rural places within the constituency. This school was built in honor of a student named Krishi Vijay Sankar.

See also
Education in India
List of schools in India

References

External links 

Schools in Telangana
Educational institutions established in 1990
Education in Khammam district
1990 establishments in Andhra Pradesh